Nekor (Berber language: N'kor) is a historic site in the Rif region of Morocco near modern-day Bni Bouayach.  It was founded by Idris ibn Salih, Emir of the medieval Kingdom of Nekor, between 749 and 761 AD. His son Sa'id I ibn Idris moved the capital to Nekor from Temsaman. At its height, it was described as the greatest center of Arabic culture in the region of Rif.

In 859 or 860 AD Nekor, defended by Sa'id II ibn Salih, was sacked by Viking raiders, apparently for attempting to interfere with their plunderings in the area, under Hastein and Björn Ironside, who sailed through the Straits of Gibraltar. After staying for eight days in Morocco, the Vikings went back to Spain and continued up the east coast. Many of the inhabitants of Nekor were taken as slaves and later sold in Ireland.

The city was destroyed by the Almoravid Yusuf ibn Tashfin in 1080 during his conquest of the Rif.

The site has been partially submerged by the reservoir of the Abdelkrim Khattabi dam.

References

Archaeological sites in Morocco
Capitals of former nations
Rif